Fly Yeti (stylized as flyyeti.com) was a low-cost airline based in Kathmandu, Nepal. The airline was a joint venture between the Nepalese regional carrier Yeti Airlines and Air Arabia. The airline suspended all flights from 16 July 2008, citing political uncertainty.  The company slogan was Pay less, fly more.

History
Fly Yeti was founded in 2007 as Nepal's first low-cost carrier and commenced operations on 20 January 2008. Despite its parent company Air Arabia claiming that the airline had a sufficiently high occupancy, Fly Yeti ceased operations on 16 July 2008 due to political uncertainty in Nepal.

Destinations
Fly Yeti served the following destinations at the time of closure:

Fly Yeti had also planned to serve Bangkok, Delhi and Hong Kong.

Fleet

At the time of its closure, Fly Yeti operated the following aircraft:

References

External links
  via Wayback Machine´

Defunct airlines of Nepal
Airlines established in 2007
Airlines disestablished in 2008
Nepalese companies established in 2007
2008 disestablishments in Nepal